Scott William Carter is an American fiction writer. He writes in multiple genres, including fantasy, mystery, and young adult.

Biography
Carter was born in Minnesota and raised in Oregon's Willamette Valley.  Before becoming a professional writer, Carter owned a bookstore, worked as a ski instructor, and a computer trainer.

Carter attended the University of Oregon, graduating in 1994 with a Bachelor of Arts in English. Currently living in Oregon, he is married and is a father of two children, a daughter and a son.

He won the 2011 Oregon Book Award for Young Adult Literature for his novel, The Last Great Getaway of the Water Balloon Boys. He is also the author of the highly acclaimed Garrison Gage mystery series, among other books.

Bibliography

Novels (Garrison Gage Series)
 The Gray and Guilty Sea (2010) 
 A Desperate Place for Dying (2012) 
 The Lovely Wicked Rain (2014)
 A Shroud of Tattered Sails (2015)
 A Lighthouse for the Lonely Heart (2017)
 Bury the Dead in Driftwood (2019)

Novels (Myron Vale Series)
 Ghost Detective (2013)
 The Ghost Who Said Goodbye (2015)
 The Ghost, the Girl, and the Gold (2016)

Novels (Other)
 The Last Great Getaway of the Water Balloon Boys (2010) 
 President Jock, Vice President Geek (2011) 
 Drawing a Dark Way: A Fantasy Adventure (2011)
 A Tale of Two Giants (2011)
 The Care and Feeding of Rubber Chickens (2011)
 Wooden Bones (2012)
 The Castle on the Hill at the Edge of the World (2019)

Short Story Collections
 The Dinosaur Diaries and Other Tales Across Space and Time (2010) 
 A Web of Black Widows (2010) 
 The Man Who Made No Mistakes (2013)

Short Stories (Incomplete)
 "The Liberators", Analog Science Fiction and Fact (2004) Vol. 124, No. 4.
 "A Christmas in Amber", Analog Science Fiction and Fact (2005) Vol. 125, No. 12.
 "Father Hagerman's Dog", Analog Science Fiction and Fact (2007) Vol. 127, No 6.
 "The Bear Who Sang Opera", Analog Science Fiction and Fact (2009) Vol. 129, No. 7 & 8.
 "The Android Who Became a Human Who Became an Android", Analog Science Fiction and Fact (2010) Vol. 130, No. 7 & 8.

References

External links
 Scott William Carter's official homepage

21st-century American novelists
American male novelists
American science fiction writers
Novelists from Oregon
University of Oregon alumni
Novelists from Minnesota
Living people
American male short story writers
21st-century American short story writers
21st-century American male writers
Year of birth missing (living people)